This is a list of musicians who have played rockabilly. For a list of psychobilly musicians, see list of psychobilly bands.

0–9 

 The 5.6.7.8's

A 
 Ace Andres
 Hasil Adkins
 Ace and the Ragers
 Amazing Royal Crowns

B 
 Smokey Joe Baugh
 Tommy Blake
 Eddie Bond
 Bonnie Lou
 Jimmy Bowen
 BR549
 Sonny Burgess
 Johnny Burnette
 The Blasters
 Rocky Burnette
 The Baseballs
 Drake Bell
 Boz Boorer
 Billy Burnette

C 

 Ray Campi
 Johnny Carroll
 Johnny Cash
 Crazy Cavan and the Rhythm Rockers
 Sanford Clark
 Joe Clay
 Eddie Cochran
 The Collins Kids
 Commander Cody and His Lost Planet Airmen 
 Creedence Clearwater Revival
 Crash Craddock
 Mac Curtis
 Sonny Curtis
 The Chop Tops
 Cigar Store Indians

D 

 Ronnie Dawson
 Jesse Dayton
 Mike Deasy
 Deke Dickerson
 Al Downing

E 
 Jack Earls
 Duane Eddy
 Dave Edmunds
 The Everly Brothers

F 

 Werly Fairburn
 Charlie Feathers
 Narvel Felts
 Sonny Fisher
 Eddie Fontaine
 The Four Aces
 Billy Fury
 Flat Duo Jets
 Tav Falco
 Rosie Flores

G 

 Glen Glenn
 Danny Gatton
 Robert Gordon

H 
 Buddy Harman
 Bill Haley
 Hardrock Gunter
 Dale Hawkins
 Ronnie Hawkins
 Mickey Hawks
 Dave Hawley
 Roy Head
 Eric Heatherly
 Buddy Holly
 The Honeydrippers
 Johnny Horton
 The Head Cat
 Heavy Trash
 George Hamilton IV

I 
 James Intveld
 Chris Isaak

J 

 Roddy Jackson
 Wanda Jackson
 Jackslacks
 Juke Joint Gamblers
 Jason & the Scorchers
 The Jets
 Jimmy and the Mustangs

K 

 Buddy Knox

L 
 Sleepy LaBeef
 Gene Lamarr
 Langi Seli og Skuggarnir
 Brenda Lee
 Alis Lesley
 Jerry Lee Lewis
 Margaret Lewis
 Jim Lowe
 Nick Lowe
 Lyle Lovett
 Bob Luman
 The Lucky Bullets
 Legendary Shack Shakers 
 The Living End
 Lone Justice

M 

 Janis Martin
 Matchbox
 Imelda May
 JD McPherson
 Lonnie Mack
 Carl Mann
 Grady Martin
 Clinton Miller
 Bob Moore
 Sparkle Moore
 Roy Moss
 Keith O'Conner Murphy

N 

 Ricky Nelson
 Steve Nardella
 Mojo Nixon

O 

 Roy Orbison
 Buck Owens

P 

 Carl Perkins
 Joe Poovey
 Johnny Powers
 Elvis Presley
 The Phenomenauts
 The Polecats

R

 Marvin Rainwater
 Jerry Reed
 Jody Reynolds
 Cliff Richard
 Charlie Rich
 Billy Lee Riley
 Marty Robbins
 Rattled Roosters
 The Reverend Horton Heat
 Lee Rocker
 The RockTigers
 Skid Roper
 Dexter Romweber
 The Razorbacks
 Red Hot and Blue
 The Rockats
 Rockpile
 Royal Teens
 Jane Rose

S 

 Jack Scott
 Ronnie Self
 Brian Setzer
 Del Shannon
 Jumpin' Gene Simmons
 Ray Smith
 Warren Smith
 Sonny and his Wild Cows
 Bobby Sowell
 Gene Summers
 Dan Sartain
 Southern Culture on the Skids
 Shakin Stevens
 Stray Cats
 Billy Swan

T 

 Tom Tall
 Vernon Taylor
 Vince Taylor
 The Thirsty Crows
 Hayden Thompson
 Tommy & The Tom Toms aka The Bill Smith Combo
 Conway Twitty

V 
 Gene Vincent
 Volbeat

W 

 Marty Wilde
 Hank Williams
 Link Wray

Y 

 The Young Werewolves
 Dwight Yoakam
 Malcolm Yelvington
 Neil Young and the Shocking Pinks

Z 

 Eddie Zack

References 

 
Rockabilly